Tunstall Sr. High School is a high school located in Dry Fork, Virginia. About 900 students go to the school each year. The school has two levels and was recently renovated over the past several years. Tunstall High School was named for a long time legislator and lawyer, Whitmell P. Tunstall. It was formed in 1964 by the merging of Brosville High and Whitmell High. In 2016, Tunstall was named a National Blue Ribbon school by the U.S. Department of Education. Tunstall was the only high school in the state of Virginia to win the award.  The official school colors are red and white.

Clubs and Activities 
Robotics team, French club, Spanish club,  varsity Football team, junior varsity football team,  varsity baseball team, golf team, junior varsity basketball team, varsity basketball team, marching band, chorus, FCCLA, DECA, wrestling, Scholastic Bowl/ACE

Notable alumni 

Joe Mantiply — pitcher, Arizona Diamondbacks

References

External links
 Official web site

Public high schools in Virginia
Schools in Pittsylvania County, Virginia
1964 establishments in Virginia
Educational institutions established in 1964